Anuching Mogini (born 1 March 2003) is a Bangladeshi women's football forward. She currently plays at the Bangladesh women's national under-17 football team. She was a member of the AFC U-14 Girls' Regional Championship – South and Central winning team in 2016 in Tajikistan. She scored five goals in that tournament. She is the younger twin sister of Anai Mogini, who also plays football.

Early years
Anuching Mogini was born in 2003 in Khagrachhari district. Her father, Ripru Magh, is a farmer. She studied at Ghagra Bohumukhi High School in Rangamati district.

Playing career
Anuching Mogini started playing football in 2011. She played in the Bangamata Sheikh Fazilatunnesa Mujib Gold Cup Football Tournament for Mogachori Primary School. The team became the champion that year. She represented Narayanganj in the KFC national women's championship in 2014 as her home district, Khagrachhari, was not taking part in the competition.

International
Anuching Mogini was selected to the Bangladesh women's U-17 team for the 2017 AFC U-16 Women's Championship qualification – Group C matches. She scored five goals in that tournament. Being group C champion, Bangladesh have qualified for the 2017 AFC U-16 Women's Championship in Thailand in September 2017.

Honours
 AFC U-14 Girls' Regional C'ship – South and Central
 Bangladesh U-14 Girls'
 Champion: 2016

References

2003 births
Living people
Bangladeshi women's footballers
Women's association football forwards
Bangladesh Women's Football League players
People from Khagrachhari District
Marma people
Bangladeshi Buddhists
South Asian Games bronze medalists for Bangladesh
South Asian Games medalists in football